Song of the Islands is a studio album by country music singer Marty Robbins. It was released in 1957 by Columbia Records.

In the annual poll of country music disc jockeys by Billboard magazine, Song of the Islands was rated No. 5 among the "Favorite C&W Albums" of 1958.

AllMusic gave the album a rating of four-and-a-half stars. Reviewer Timothy Monger called it "one of the terrific curiosities of [Robbins'] lengthy career."

Track listing
Side A
 "Songs of the Islands"
 "Don't Sing Aloha When I Go"
 "Beyond the Reef"
 "Crying Steel Guitar Waltz"
 "My Isle of Golden Dreams"
 "Now Is the Hour"

Side B
 "Sweet Leilani"
 "Down Where the Trade Winds Blow"
 "Constancy"
 "Iceland Echoes"
 "Moonland"
 "Aloha ʻOe"

References

1957 albums
Marty Robbins albums
Columbia Records albums